The women's 30 kilometre classical cross-country skiing competition at the 2010 Winter Olympics in Vancouver, Canada was held on 27 February at Whistler Olympic Park in Whistler, British Columbia at 11:45 PST.

Summary
The 30 kilometre has been skated as a mass start event at the World Championships since 2005 and since the 2006 Winter Olympics. Kateřina Neumannová of the Czech Republic was the defending Olympic champion though that event was held in the freestyle technique. She retired after the 2006-07 season and later chaired the organizing committee for the 2009 world championships. Poland's Justyna Kowalczyk, the defending Olympic bronze medallist, was the reigning world champion though that was also in the freestyle technique. The last World Cup event in the 30 km classical took place in Trondheim, Norway on 14 March 2009 and was won by Petra Majdič of Slovenia.

The race was a mass start event where all of the skiers start at the same time.

Results
This race also matched up the last four world champions in this event (Zavyalova: 2003, Bjørgen: 2005, Kuitunen: 2007, and Kowalczyk: 2009.).

At the 7.1 km mark, the top three leaders were Størmer Steira (who finished eighth), Jatskaja (who finished 19th), and Kalla (who finished sixth). Kowalczyk, the defending world champion, led at the halfway mark, followed by Saarinen and Longa (who finished 12th). Bjørgen, the 2005 world champion in this event, held the lead at the 22.1 km mark, followed by Kowalczyk and Saarinen, who changed skis at the 25 km mark. Kowalczyk's finish over Bjørgen was the closest in Olympic history, edging out Neumannová's 1.4-second win over Russia's Yuliya Chepalova at the previous Olympics in Turin.

Kowalczyk is the first woman from Poland to win a gold medal at the Winter Olympics and only the second overall, after Wojciech Fortuna's victory in the ski jumping individual large hill event at the 1972 Winter Olympics in Sapporo. Saarinen earned her first and only individual Winter Olympic medal. 2003 World champion Zavylova finished 23rd while 2007 World champion Kuitunen finished 14th.

References

External links
 2010 Winter Olympics results:Ladies' 30 km, Mass Start Classic, from https://web.archive.org/web/20100222080013/http://www.vancouver2010.com/ retrieved 2010-02-26.

Women's cross-country skiing at the 2010 Winter Olympics
Women's 30 kilometre cross-country skiing at the Winter Olympics